Bang!Zoom is a 1995 studio album by American vocalist and jazz/folk musician Bobby McFerrin, released by Blue Note Records. The line-up includes several members of the jazz fusion band Yellowjackets.

The album reached number 10 on Billboard's Top Contemporary Jazz Albums chart.

Track listing

Critical reception 

In terms of critical reception, the album was met with only a 2 star-review on behalf of Allmusic.

References 

1995 albums
Bobby McFerrin albums
Blue Note Records albums